Gianvincenzo Carafa (1477–1541) was an Italian Roman Catholic bishop and cardinal.

Biography

A member of the della Stadera branch of the House of Carafa, Gianvincenzo Carafa was born in Naples in 1477, the son of Fabrizio Carafa, signore of Torre del Greco, and Aurelia Tolomei.

He was the half-nephew of Cardinal Oliviero Carafa.

Early in his career, he became a canon deacon of the cathedral chapter of Naples Cathedral.

On 13 September 1497 he was elected Bishop of Rimini.  He was the administrator of the diocese until he reached the canonical age of 27; he was elevated to bishop on 1 April 1504, with dispensation for not yet reaching the canonical age.  He occupied the see until 24 June 1530, when he resigned in favor of his nephew Francesco Carafa.

He participated in the Fifth Council of the Lateran (1512–17).  Pope Julius II wanted to make him a cardinal but Ferdinand II of Aragon, who was then occupying the Kingdom of Naples, objected to the promotion of Neapolitans.  Pope Leo X made him an Assistant at the Pontifical Throne.  On 2 December 1521, during the sede vacante following the death of Pope Leo X, the College of Cardinals elected him governor of Rome; he occupied this post until 1522, when Pope Adrian VI was elected.

Pope Clement VII made him a cardinal priest in the consistory of 21 November 1527.  He received the red hat and the titular church of Santa Pudenziana on 27 April 1528.

He was the administrator of the see of Anglona from 31 August 1528 to 6 September 1536, when he resigned in favor of his nephew Oliverio Carafa.  He was Camerlengo of the Sacred College of Cardinals from 8 January 1533 to 9 January 1534.

He participated in the papal conclave of 1534 that elected Pope Paul III.

From 26 July 1535 until 21 April 1539 he was the administrator of the see of Acerra.  He opted for the titular church of Santa Prisca on 23 July 1537, and for Santa Maria in Trastevere on 28 November 1537.  On 4 August 1539 he opted for the order of cardinal bishops and received the suburbicarian see of Palestrina.  When Pope Paul III went to Vicenza, Cardinal Carafa was legate a latere in Rome.

He died in Naples on 28 August 1541 and is buried in Naples Cathedral.

See also
Catholic Church in Italy

References

1477 births
1541 deaths
16th-century Italian cardinals
Gianvincenzo
Clergy from Naples
16th-century Italian Roman Catholic archbishops